Dastjerd Rural District may refer to:

Dastjerd Rural District (Azarshahr County)
Dastjerd Rural District (Qazvin Province)
Dastjerd Rural District (Qom Province)